Hôtel des Monnaies may refer to:
Hôtel des Monnaies, Paris
Hôtel des Monnaies/Munthof metro station